Owariyaor Honke Owariya is the oldest restaurant in Kyoto, Japan; it was founded in 1465. The specialty are traditional buckwheat noodles - called soba - and even the royal family eats here when they come to Kyoto.
The restaurant uses the "freshest" Kyoto spring well water to make its delicious soup broth.

History
The restaurant has been located on the same plot of soil in Kyoto since 1465. Honke Owarya began as a confectionery shop, it was later developed into a soba shop by a chef from Nagoya accompanied by members of the imperial family.

Honke Owariya has been associated with several temples in Kyoto from the Edo Period. It fostered bonds with Zen Buddhist sects from Kennin-ji, Shokoku-ji and Myoshin-ji.

The current, and sixteenth owner of Honke Owariya is Ariko Inaoka, who follows in the tradition of her father (the 15th owner) and grandfather (the 14th owner).

See also 
List of oldest companies

References

External links 
Official website of Honke Owariya
Location on Google Maps

Restaurants in Japan
Companies based in Kyoto
Companies established in the 15th century
1460s establishments in Japan